Rolf Hofmeier (born October 23, 1939) was director of the Institute for Africa Studies (IAK) from 1976 to 2000 in the network of the German Overseas Institute (DÜI), founded in 1964, in Hamburg. The latter was merged into the German Institute for Global and Area Studies (GIGA), a member of the Leibniz Association, in 2007. Rolf Hofmeier was appointed associate professor. After his retirement, Hofmeier remained an associate member of the GIGA.

Biography 
Before working at the ‘Institute for African Studies’, Hofmeier worked for six years in Tanzania at the University of Dar es Salaam, in the Ministry of Economic Affairs and as head of a development aid project. In his scientific career he researched solutions to the problem of Sub-Saharan Africa with a focus on East Africa. Central points of his work were economic analyses of crisis prevention in ethnic-social conflicts, opportunities for democratization, liberalization of economic policy and the effects of development aid. In line with the assignment of tasks of the DÜI, Hofmeier pursued an application-oriented approach in close cooperation with Hamburg's economy, the Federal Foreign Office and the Federal Ministry for Economic Cooperation and Development (BMZ) in Bonn. Hofmeier was involved as a project supervisor or co-project supervisor in numerous research projects on Sub-Saharan Africa, for example, in a project of the Collaborative Research Centres (SFB), financed by the Deutsche Forschungsgemeinschaft (DFG) at the University of Hamburg, on 'State consolidation and state failure in East and Central Africa: Local statehood and political change in Tanzania/DR Congo'.

Publications (selection) 

... Die Politische Ökonomie von Verkehrsvorhaben in Afrika: Zur Einschätzung der ökonomischen, gesellschaftlichen und politischen Wirkungen von großen Eisenbahn- und Straßenprojekten. Africa Spectrum, vol. 14 (1) (1979), pp. 4–18 
... The political economy of transport projects. Intereconomics, vol. 15, pp. 94–99 (1980)
... Die wirtschaftliche und rohstoffpolitische Bedeutung Afrikas und seiner einzelnen Regionen (Südafrika, Schwarzafrika, Nordafrika) für die Bundesrepublik Deutschland. Hamburg: Institut für Afrika-Kunde im Verbund der Stiftung Deutsches Übersee-Institut (DÜI), 1981, 506 p.
... Politisches Lexikon Afrika, eds.. Rolf Hofmeier & Mathias Schönborn. Munich: C.H. Beck, Beck'sche schwarze Reihe; Bd. 281, 1984, 524 p.
. Aid from the Federal Republic of Germany to Africa. Journal of Modern African Studies, vol. 24 (4), (1986), pp. 577–601 
... Politische Konditionierung von Entwicklungshilfe in Afrika: Neue Form der Einmischung oder legitime Unterstützung von Demokratiebestrebungen?  Africa Spectrum, vol. 25 (2), (1990), pp. 167–177 
... Das subsaharische Afrika: Stiefkind der aussenpolitischen Aufmerksamkeit. In: Kaiser, Karl, Joachim Krause (eds.): Deutschlands neue Außenpolitik. volume 3. Interessen und Strategien. Munich: 1996, pp. 203–210 
... Five decades of German-African relations: limited interests, low political profile and substantial aid donor. In: Engel, Ulf, Robert Kappel (eds.): Germany's Africa policy revisited. Interests, images and incrementalism. Münster u. a., LiT-Verlag, 2002, pp. 39–62 
... Kleines Afrika-Lexikon: Poltik, Wirtschaft, Kultur. (eds.), with Andreas Mehler, München: C.H.Beck, 2004, 359 S. 
... Afrika Jahrbuch - Politik, Wirtschaft und Gesellschaft in Afrika südlich der Sahara. Eds.: Institut für Afrika-Studien & Rolf Hofmeier, Wiesbaden: VS Verlag für Sozialwissenschaften, 1987ff 
... A Decade of Tanzania: Politics, Economy and Society 2005–2017, with Kurt Hirschler. Leiden: Brill, 2019, 261 S.

External links 
 Literature by and about Rolf Hofmeier in the catalog of Deutsche Nationalbibliothek

References 

1939 births
German economists
Scientists from Hamburg
Living people